The 2007 Air New Zealand Cup was a provincial rugby union competition involving 14 teams from New Zealand. Matches started on Thursday 26 July 2007, and the Final, in which Auckland defeated Wellington, was held on Saturday 20 October.

This season was the second of the expanded competition, which succeeded the First Division of the National Provincial Championship. There were some major changes to the competition from that of the 2006 season. The original Rounds One (initial pool play) and Two (Top Six and Repechage phases) were scrapped. Instead, there was a 10-week round robin in which every team will miss out on playing 3 teams in the competition. This was followed by the quarterfinals, semifinal and the final as in 2006.

Unless otherwise noted the information is sourced from here:

Standings
The top eight teams in pool play advanced to the quarterfinals.

Table notes:
 Secured home quarterfinal berth
 Secured away quarterfinal berth
 Abbreviations: 
 It is possible to receive 2 bonus points in a loss.
 In the event of a tie on points, the higher ranked team is decided on the basis of who won when they met in pool play. If they remain tied, then it is decided by points differential.

Point scorers

Try scorers

Fixtures and results

|-border="1" cellpadding="5" cellspacing="0"
! bgcolor="#efefef"|
! bgcolor="#efefef"|Dates
|- align="center" bgcolor="#cedff2"
|Week 1
| 26–29 July
|- align="center" bgcolor="#FFFFFF"
|Week 2
| 2–5 August
|- align="center" bgcolor="cedff2"
|Week 3
| 9–12 August
|- align="center" bgcolor="#FFFFFF"
|Week 4
| 16–19 August
|- align="center" bgcolor="#cedff2"
|Week 5
| 23–26 August
|- align="center" bgcolor="#FFFFFF"
|Week 6
| 30 August – 2 September
|- align="center" bgcolor="#cedff2"
|Week 7
| 6–9 September
|- align="center" bgcolor="#FFFFFF"
|Week 8
| 13–16 September
|- align="center" bgcolor="#cedff2"
|Week 9
| 20–23 September
|- align="center" bgcolor="#FFFFFF"
|Week 10
| 27–30 September

Week 1

Week 2

Week 3

Week 4

Week 5

Week 6

Week 7

Week 8

Week 9

Week 10

Knockout stage

Quarterfinals

Semifinals

Final

See also
 Air New Zealand Cup

References

2007 in New Zealand rugby union
National Provincial Championship